Laniers Creek is a  long 2nd order tributary to the Uwharrie River in Randolph County, North Carolina.  This is the only stream of this name in the United States.

Course
Laniers Creek rises in a pond on the Cabin Creek divide at Complex, North Carolina.  Laniers Creek then flows easterly to join the Uwharrie River about 1.5 miles east of New Hope.

Watershed
Laniers Creek drains  of area, receives about 47.1 in/year of precipitation, has a wetness index of 398.45 and is about 39% forested.

See also
List of rivers of North Carolina

References

Rivers of North Carolina
Rivers of Randolph County, North Carolina